Flumeri is a town and comune in the province of Avellino, Campania, southern Italy.

Located in the Apennines upon a knoll within the Ufita Valley, the town is part of the Roman Catholic Diocese of Ariano Irpino-Lacedonia. Its territory borders with the municipalities of Ariano Irpino, Castel Baronia, Frigento, Grottaminarda, San Nicola Baronia, San Sossio Baronia, Sturno, Villanova del Battista and Zungoli.

References

Cities and towns in Campania